WNYU-FM (89.1 FM) is a college radio station owned and operated by New York University. Its offices and studios are located at NYU's campus in lower Manhattan. WNYU's main transmitter is located at University Heights in the Bronx, the former location of NYU. Another transmitter, licensed as WNYU-FM1, a repeater located at University Plaza at the current campus.

External links
 WNYU Homepage
 Records of WNYU, New York University Archives at New York University Special Collections

References

NYU-FM
New York University
Radio stations established in 1973